Sufiyan (also Romanized as Şufīyān, Soofiyan, Şowfyān, and Sūfīyān) is a city in Sufian District of Shabestar County, East Azerbaijan province, Iran. At the 2006 census, its population was 8,733 in 2,427 households. The following census in 2011 counted 9,126 people in 2,830 households. The latest census in 2016 showed a population of 9,963 people in 3,273 households. There is a major cement factory operated by the Sufiyan Cement Company to the southeast of the city. The city has at least 5 mosques, 4 of them in close proximity in the city centre.

References 

Shabestar County

Cities in East Azerbaijan Province

Populated places in East Azerbaijan Province

Populated places in Shabestar County